The Brackley LTC Tournament was a late Victorian era combined men's and women's grass court tennis tournament staged only one time from 1 to 6 August 1882 at the Brackley Lawn Tennis Club, Brackley, West Northamptonshire, England.

History
The Brackley LTC Tournament was a tennis event held between August 1st and August 6th 1882 as part of the Brackley Show. The gentleman's singles event was won by Mr. Francis Regner Brooksbank Pinhorn who defeated Mr. William Blencowe. The mixed doubles event was won by Mr. John Boyd and Miss Mary Blencowe who defeated Mr. Patrick Smyth and Mrs. Winifred Barlow.

Results

Mens Singles

Mixed Doubles

References

External links
Official Site: Brackley Tennis Club

Grass court tennis tournaments
Defunct tennis tournaments in the United Kingdom